Tino Sabbadini (Monsempron-Libos, 21 August 1928 — Monsempron-Libos, 7 November 2002) was a French professional road bicycle racer. He won the fourth stage of the 1958 Tour de France.

Major results

1950
Villeneuve sur Lot
1955
Nantes
Circuit de la Vienne
1956
Circuit de l'Indre
Villeneuve sur Lot
1957
Circuit de l'Indre
1958
Eymet
GP de Cannes
Gap
Tour de France:
Winner stage 5
1959
Agen
1960
Trédion
1961
Bayonne
La Couronne
1963
Mazamet

External links 

Official Tour de France results for Tino Sabbadini

French male cyclists
1928 births
2002 deaths
French Tour de France stage winners
Sportspeople from Lot-et-Garonne
Cyclists from Nouvelle-Aquitaine